Helena (Ilona) of Hungary ( – 25 December 1199), a member of the royal Árpád dynasty, was Duchess of Austria from 1177 and Styria from 1192 to 1194 by her marriage with the Babenberg duke Leopold V of Austria.

Biography 
Helena was the daughter of King Géza II of Hungary and his wife, Euphrosyne of Kiev, a daughter of Grand Prince Mstislav I of Kiev by his second wife, Liubava Dmitrievna. Little is known of her life or character. The only clear facts about her life are that at Pentecost 1174 she was married to Leopold V of Austria. The marriage reflected the westward orientation of the Hungarian House of Árpád in view of the expansionist politics of the Byzantine emperor Manuel I Komnenos. Leopold's sister Agnes had already married King Stephen III of Hungary, Helena's elder brother who had died in 1172.

Helena and Leopold had issue; he died on 31 December 1194 as a result of a horse accident. Helena died five years later in 1199 and was buried beside her husband in Heiligenkreuz Abbey.

Marriage and children
By her marriage to Duke Leopold V, Helena had at least two (possibly as many as four) children:
 Frederick I (d. 16 April 1198)
 Leopold VI (d. 28 July 1230)
 ?Agnes
 ?Bertha

Footnotes

1150s births
1199 deaths
Hungarian princesses
House of Árpád
Austrian royal consorts
Babenberg
Year of birth uncertain
12th-century Hungarian people
12th-century Hungarian women
12th-century Austrian people
12th-century Austrian women
Daughters of kings